Pelosi in the House is a 2022 American documentary film about American congresswoman Nancy Pelosi. Released in December 2022 on HBO, it provides a behind-the-scenes look at the career of Pelosi. The SF Chronicle called the film "essential viewing." The New York Times review says "it provides an unusual opportunity to watch Pelosi negotiate legislation and rally votes."

References

External links

HBO documentary films
Documentary films about American politics